Long Run is a neighborhood of Louisville, Kentucky located near Shelbyville Road 
(US 60) and Clark Station Road.

References

Neighborhoods in Louisville, Kentucky